The voting rights of prisoners in New Zealand have been in a near constant state of flux since the first election in New Zealand in 1853. Prisoners have experienced varying degrees of enfranchisement. In 2010 the Electoral Act 1993 was amended to disqualify all prisoners from voting (regardless of the length of sentence imposed). In 2020 this law was amended so that only persons serving a sentence of imprisonment for a term of three years or more are disenfranchised. Elections in New Zealand are held every three years.

History before 1993 
The New Zealand Constitution Act 1852 set out the requirements for enfranchisement. Prisoners were expressly excluded from registration for voting where they were serving a sentence for "any treason, felony, or infamous offence". Prisoners who had completed their sentence were eligible to vote. In 1879, prisoners were further disenfranchised by the Qualification of Electors Act. This Act provided that prisoners who had completed their punishments were not able to register to vote again until 12 months had passed since the end of their sentence.

The enactment of the Electoral Act 1905 again changed the scope of prisoner enfranchisement. This Act removed the 12 month post-imprisonment disqualification period but widened the ambit of what kind of prisoner could be disqualified. Rather than focusing on the kind of crime committed as previous legislation had, this Act looked at the length of sentence being served, so anyone sentenced to death or a year or more was ineligible to vote. The law changed yet again in 1956, removing the one year threshold, disenfranchising all prisoners who happened to be in prison at the time of an election. The trend was very much towards increasing disenfranchisement of prisoners. However, this was reversed briefly with the passage of the Electoral Amendment Act 1975. This amended the 1956 Act and completely removed the provision which took away the right of prisoners to vote. This change did not last long. By 1977, the law had again reverted to the original 1956 position of complete disenfranchisement for anyone serving a custodial sentence at the time of an election.

Electoral Act 1993  
In 1993, New Zealand underwent an electoral system overhaul, and as a result, the rights of prisoners were changed again. With the enactment of the Electoral Act 1993, some prisoners were re-enfranchised. This act only excluded prisoners sentenced to life, preventive detention or a sentence longer than three years from voting. This remained the position until 2010.

Law from 2010 to present

Passage of legislation

The Electoral (Disqualification of Sentenced Prisoners) Amendment Bill was introduced into Parliament as a private member's bill by Paul Quinn of the National Party on 10 February 2010. The Bill's first reading occurred on 21 April 2010. It was then referred to the Law and Order Select Committee to review the legislation and make any changes necessary. The decision to send the Bill to the Law and Order Select Committee was criticised by opponents of the Bill, with members of the Labour Party walking out of the committee meeting on the first day. This is because the Law and Order committee is primarily staffed with members from the Department of Corrections who traditionally deal with "matters relating to corrections, courts, criminal law, police, and serious fraud." It was contended by opposition members that a more appropriate committee would have been the Justice and Electoral Committee. This committee is aided by staff from the Ministry of Justice and deals with "matters relating to Crown legal and drafting services, electoral matters, human rights, and justice." The select committee received a large number of submissions on the Bill, with the majority being opposed to the legislation's passage. There were two submissions made in support of the Bill, one of which was by the legislation's introducer, Paul Quinn. However, some of the submissions made were as part of assessment for an Otago University paper, and this could have skewed the results slightly. Despite the overwhelming number of submissions opposed, the Bill was returned to the House with little changed. The Bill had its second reading on 20 October 2010. Its final reading was on 8 December 2010 and it received Royal Assent on 15 December 2010. The legislation took effect from 16 December 2010.

Effect of legislation

Under this new legislation, any prisoner who is detained in a prison is unable to register as an elector in New Zealand. This is achieved by the deregistration of prisoners, meaning they will have to reregister to vote when released from prison. The legislation is not retrospective in effect, so any prisoners who were convicted to a less than three-year sentence before the enactment of the new law, would still be allowed to vote. In its original form, the legislation did not include a saving provision of this nature, so it would have had the effect of disenfranchising everyone convicted after the commencement of the Act, but also of re-enfranchising everyone convicted before the Act. This drafting oversight was amended by way of supplementary order paper, as it would have completely undermined the point of the legislation if enacted in that form.

Justifications for the law

Paul Quinn, the member who sponsored this legislation, bases his justification for the legislation loosely on social contract theory. This is the idea that prisoners have breached the contract with the state and therefore, some of their rights can be validly restricted. This was the view advanced by many supporting members in their speeches but perhaps put most clearly by Jonathan Young during the bills Third reading. "The social contract that undergirds every stable society must balance human rights with human responsibilities, or said essentially, in order to participate in the process of selecting our lawmakers who shape our society, one ought not to be a serious lawbreaker." Removing the right to vote is essentially another form of punishment for criminals. In reality, there was little substantive argument made in favour of the legislation as it passed through Parliament, something which did not go unnoticed by commentators.

Criticisms of the law

Under section 7 of the New Zealand Bill of Rights Act 1990 (NZBORA) if there is an apparent inconsistency between legislation being introduced and the NZBORA, the Attorney-General must bring this to the attention of the House as soon as possible. There was a section 7 report filed in respect of this legislation by Christopher Finlayson. There was in the opinion of the Attorney-General an inconsistency between the Bill and section 12 of NZBORA which affirms the voting rights New Zealand citizens. Under section 5 of NZBORA, rights are not absolute, but can be limited so long as those limits are "demonstrably justified in a free and democratic society." There are two questions that the Attorney-General and the courts will look at in determining whether the limit comes under section 5. Firstly, whether the "provision serves an important and significant objective" and secondly whether there is a "rational and proportionate connection between the provision and the objective." The Attorney-General considered that although the objective of the Bill (to prevent serious offenders from voting) may have been in fact important, there was no rational connection between the limit and that objective. A blanket ban effects not only serious offenders, but all offenders regardless of the nature of their offending, so the limit is more related to the time of the offending in relation to an election. This is not a rational or proportional limitation. Academic Andrew Geddis notes that in the debates surrounding the Bill, this report was scarcely mentioned by supporters of the legislation, and there was no justification of the rights limitations made substantively by supporters either.

The uneven application of the Bill was a concern for the Attorney-General and also opposition members. An example that came up frequently in debates was the disparity between a sentence of home detention and of imprisonment and the effect that would have on offenders. It is possible to have offenders who have committed the same offence in similar circumstances have a disparity between their sentences as one may be eligible for home detention, whereas the other is not because of a difference in personal circumstances. An offender given a sentence of home detention will not be caught by this legislation and as such will not be removed from the electoral roll. The opposition also noted the position was not changing for prisoners housed in a hospital instead of a prison. Under previous legislation, they were both treated the same, but the new legislation disenfranchises offenders housed in prisons, but those housed in secure hospitals are still allowed to vote if their sentence is less than three years.

Another issue that was mentioned by opponents to the legislation and in the submission of the Electoral Enrolment Centre was the fact that prisoners are removed from the electoral roll completely. The concerns revolved around the fact that it is already difficult to get people who are marginalised onto the electoral roll, so their removal could mean that many people simply wouldn't bother to re-enrol after their release, which would mean their disenfranchisement could possibly extend much further than just the length of their sentence. The EEC suggested that the Bill be amended to include a requirement for Prison Superintendents to send the EEC a completed enrolment form when offenders are released. This was considered by the Select Committee but not adopted into the law, preferring to let the departments organise this as between themselves.

Legal challenges to the law
In 2014, the law was challenged in the High Court by a number of serving prisoners. The challenge was founded on a number of grounds, including inconsistency with multiple provisions of the New Zealand Bill of Rights Act, inconsistency with the ICCPR and inconsistency with the Treaty of Waitangi. It was alleged that not only was the legislation inconsistent with the right to vote in NZBORA, but that it would also disproportionately affect Māori, who make up around 51% of the prison population, thereby becoming a form of discrimination against Māori. The court noted that similar laws in other countries had been struck down by their higher courts, something which New Zealand courts do not have the jurisdiction to do. The court found that there was no way to read the section in a manner consistent with the NZBORA, however, because of s 4 of that Act, the provision must still be applied in full. It was also held that it would be difficult to say that the provision was in line with New Zealand's international law obligations, and that it was likely to be inconsistent with the Treaty of Waitangi, although the court did not have jurisdiction to rule on that matter. The judge said that the criticisms of the provision were "numerous and weighty" but also noted that, despite the "constitutionally objectionable" nature of the provision, "Parliament has... spoken" and declined a remedy for the applicants.

In the decision Taylor v Attorney-General  on 24 July 2015 Justice Heath in the Auckland High Court issued a formal declaration that the blanket ban on prisoners' voting was inconsistent with section 12(a) of the Bill of Rights. This is that every New Zealand citizen over the age of 18 years has the right to vote in periodic elections of member of the House of Representatives, which elections shall be by equal suffrage.

The appeal to the finding that the 2010 blanket ban was inconsistent with the section 12(a) of the Bill of Rights was dismissed on 26 May 2017 in Taylor v Attorney General NZCA 215. Additionally, the appellant was made to pay the second to fifth's respondents' costs for a complex appeal on a Band A basis with usual disbursements.

On November 9, 2018 the Supreme Court of New Zealand also agreed with the High Court's decision in favour of Taylor in Taylor v Attorney General NZSC 104.

On August 9, 2019 the Waitangi Tribunal found that "section 80(1)(d) of the Electoral Act 1993 breached the principles of the Treaty. The Tribunal further found that the Crown has failed in its duty to actively protect the right of Māori to equitably participate in the electoral process and exercise their tino rangatiratanga individually and collectively."

Restoration of prisoners' voting rights
On 23 November 2019, the Minister of Justice, Andrew Little, announced that the Sixth Labour Government would be amending the Electoral Amendment Bill to allow prisoners who had been sentenced to less than three years in prison to vote in time for the 2020 New Zealand general election; reversing the previous National Government's decision to disenfranchise all serving prisoners in 2010. The Government's policy shift had been preceded by Taylor and other prisoners' legal challenge, a High Court ruling that the law change violated the Bill of Rights Act and Treaty of Waitangi, and a Waitangi Tribunal report that the prisoner voting ban disproportionately affected Māori prisoners. While Little's announcement was welcomed by Green MP Golriz Ghahraman, National Party leader Simon Bridges criticised the Government for being "soft on crime" and vowed that a National Government would reverse any such law change.

The amendment passed and received royal assent on 29 June 2020.

References

Elections in New Zealand
Human rights abuses in New Zealand
Right of prisoners to vote